The Humanist Party is a political party in Iceland founded on 25 June 1984. It has run candidates in the 1987 and 1999 parliamentary elections, but has never achieved representation. It is related to the International Humanist Party.

They successfully applied for the list letter H to contest the 2013 Icelandic parliamentary election, and subsequently submitted an official candidate list on 12 April 2013. In the 2013 election they chose to only run candidates in the Reykjavik North and Reykjavik South constituencies.

History

The party ran candidates in the 1987 and 1999 parliamentary elections, and stood candidates for the Reykjavík City Council in 1986, 1990, 1998, and 2002. They never achieved representation in either body.

Electoral results

Parliament

References

External links
Húmanistaflokkurinn Facebook page

1984 establishments in Iceland
Anti-capitalist organizations
Collectivism
Iceland
Iceland
Libertarian socialist parties
Political parties established in 1984
Political parties in Iceland
Socialist parties in Iceland